Mitch Hill in an American college baseball coach, currently serving as head coach of the Martin Methodist College RedHawks program. He was named the head coach of the Alabama A&M Bulldogs baseball program that position prior to the 2014 season.

Hill was a pitcher for North Alabama.  He then served as a graduate assistant with the Lions for three years, handling recruiting and administrative duties.  After three years in that position, he then spent a single year each assisting at Bevill State and Motlow State.  In his year at Bevill State, he assembled a top three Alabama recruiting class, only to see the athletic program discontinued, leaving athletes in the lurch.  In 2013, he moved to Alabama A&M as an assistant, again responsible for recruiting.  Hill succeeded Michael Tompkins in July 2013.

On June 25, 2018, Hill resigned from his position at Alabama A&M and accepted the head coaching job at Martin Methodist College.

Head coaching record
Below is a table of Hill's yearly records as an NCAA head baseball coach.

References

Living people
Alabama A&M Bulldogs baseball coaches
Bevill State Bears baseball coaches
Motlow State Bucks baseball coaches
North Alabama Lions baseball coaches
North Alabama Lions baseball players
UT Southern FireHawks baseball coaches
Year of birth missing (living people)